James Marshall Unger (born May 28, 1947, in Cleveland, Ohio) is emeritus professor of Japanese at the Ohio State University.  He specializes in historical linguistics and the writing systems of East Asia, but he has also published on Japanese mathematics of the Edo period.

He chaired academic departments at the University of Hawaii at Manoa, University of Maryland, and the Ohio State University from 1988 to 2004 and has been a visiting professor/researcher at Kōbe University, Tsukuba University, the University of Tōkyō, the National Museum for Ethnography in Senri, and the National Institute for Japanese Language and Linguistics (NINJAL) in Tachikawa. Among various research grants, he has received fellowships from the Guggenheim Foundation, Ford Foundation, and the Japan Foundation (twice).

Books 
 Studies in Early Japanese Morphophonemics (Bloomington:  Indiana University Linguistics Club, 1977; 2nd ed. 1993)
 With F. C. Lorish, M. Noda, Y. Wada A Framework for Introductory Japanese Language Curricula in American High Schools and Colleges (Washington, D.C.: National Foreign Language Center, 1993)
 The Fifth Generation Fallacy (New York:  Oxford University Press, 1987)
 Literacy and Script Reform in Occupation Japan  (New York:  Oxford University Press, 1996)
 Ideogram:  Chinese Characters and the Myth of Disembodied Meaning (Honolulu:  University of Hawai'i Press, 2004)
 The Role of Contact in the Origins of the Japanese and Korean Languages (Honolulu: University of Hawai'i Press, 2009)
 Sangaku Proofs:  a Japanese Mathematician at Work (Ithaca: Cornell East Asia Series, 2015)
 Sangaku Reflections:  a Japanese Mathematician Teaches (Ithaca: Cornell East Asia Series, 2017)

References
NotesOther sources

American Japanologists
Ohio State University faculty
1947 births
Living people
Linguists from the United States
Paleolinguists
Linguists of Japanese